From Within is the third full-length studio album released by Swedish progressive rock band Anekdoten. The album was released in 1999.

Track listing
 "From Within" – 7:25
 "Kiss of Life" – 4:40
 "Groundbound" – 5:24
 "Hole" – 11:08
 "Slow Fire" – 7:26
 "Firefly" – 4:49
 "The Sun Absolute" – 6:39
 "For Someone" –  3:30

Personnel
 Peter Nordins – percussion, vibraphone
 Nicklas Berg – guitar, mellotron, wurlitzer
 Anna Sofi Dahlberg – piano, cello, vocals, mellotron, Fender Rhodes
 Jan Erik Liljestrom – bass, vocals
and
 Simon Nordberg – piano, Hammond organ
 Janne Hansson – engineer

References

External links 
 

Anekdoten albums
1999 albums